Sohatu is a commune in Călărași County, Muntenia, Romania. It is composed of two villages, Sohatu and Progresu.

As of 2002 the population of Sohatu is 3,478.

Natives
Constanța Burcică

References

Sohatu
Localities in Muntenia